The 2020–21 season is CSKA 1948's first season in the Bulgarian First League, after CSKA (Sofia) bankrupt in 2016, following three promotions in four seasons.  They will also take part in the Bulgarian Cup.

Players

Squad stats 

|-
|colspan="14"|Players sold or loaned out after the start of the season:

|}

Players in/out

Summer transfers 

In:

Out:

Winter transfers 

In:

Out:

Matches

First League

Table

Fixtures and results

Bulgarian Cup

Friendlies

References

External links
Official website
bgclubs.eu

CSKA 1948
FC CSKA 1948 Sofia seasons